The 2004 Conservative Party of Canada leadership election took place on March 20, 2004, in Toronto, Ontario, and resulted in the election of Stephen Harper as the first leader of the new Conservative Party of Canada. The Conservative Party was formed by the merger of the Canadian Alliance and the Progressive Conservative Party of Canada, in December 2003.

Stephen Harper, the former leader of the Canadian Alliance, was elected on the first (and only) ballot. Tony Clement, a former Ontario Progressive Conservative health minister, and Belinda Stronach, the former Chief Executive Officer of Magna International, were the other candidates on the ballot.

The leader was selected by a system in which each of the party's riding associations was allocated 100 points, which were allocated among candidates in proportion to the votes that he or she received. This system was selected as a condition of the merger, to prevent the far larger Canadian Alliance membership base from overwhelming that of the Progressive Conservatives.

Members voted using ranked ballots. If no candidate won a majority of votes in the first round, the ballots supporting the candidate with the smallest number of votes would be re-distributed according to the voters' second preferences. Subsequent rounds were not needed, however, because Stephen Harper won in the first round.

Candidates

Tony Clement
42, Progressive Conservative Party of Ontario Member of Provincial Parliament for Brampton South (1995–2003), provincial Ministry of Health and Long-Term Care (2001–2003), provincial Minister of Municipal Affairs and Housing (1999–2001), provincial Minister of the Environment (1999–2000), provincial Minister of Transportation (1997–1999), third place candidate in Progressive Conservative Party of Ontario leadership election (2002)

Caucus Endorsements
MPs: (5) Gerald Keddy (South Shore, NS), Chuck Strahl (Fraser Valley, BC), Norman Doyle (St. John's East, NL), Art Hanger (Calgary Northeast, AB), Peter Goldring (Edmonton Centre-East, AB)
Senators: (2) Brenda Robertson (NB), Wilbert Keon (ON)

Stephen Harper

44, Reform Party of Canada MP for Calgary West (1993–1997), Canadian Alliance MP for Calgary Southwest (2002–), Leader of the Canadian Alliance (2002–2003), President of the National Citizens Coalition (1998–2002)

Caucus Endorsements
MPs: (50) Jim Abbott (Kootenay-Columbia, BC), Diane Ablonczy (Calgary Nose Hill, AB), Rob Anders (Calgary West, AB), David Anderson (Cypress Hills—Grasslands, SK), Roy Bailey (Souris-Moose Mountain, SK), Leon Benoit (Lakeland, AB), Garry Breitkreuz (Yorkton-Melville, SK), Andy Burton (Skeena, BC), Chuck Cadman (Surrey North, BC), Rick Casson (Lethbridge, AB), Dave Chatters (Athabasca, AB), John Duncan (Vancouver Island North, BC), Reed Elley (Nanaimo-Cowichan, BC), Ken Epp (Elk Island, AB), Brian Fitzpatrick (Prince Albert, SK), Paul Forseth (New Westminster—Coquitlam—Burnaby, BC), Jim Gouk (Kootenay—Boundary—Okanagan, BC), Gurmant Grewal (Surrey Central, BC), Dick Harris (Prince George-Bulkley Valley, BC), Jay Hill (Prince George-Peace River, BC), Betty Hinton (Kamloops, Thompson and Highland Valleys, BC), Rahim Jaffer (Edmonton-Strathcona, AB), Dale Johnston (Wetaskiwin, AB), Jason Kenney (Calgary Southeast, AB), Gary Lunn (Saanich-Gulf Islands, BC), James Lunney (Nanaimo-Alberni, BC), Philip Mayfield (Cariboo—Chilcotin, BC), Grant McNally (Dewdney-Alouette, BC), Rob Merrifield (Yellowhead, AB), Bob Mills (Red Deer, AB), James Moore (Port Moody—Coquitlam, BC), Deepak Obhrai (Calgary East, AB), Brian Pallister (Portage-Lisgar, MB), Charlie Penson (Peace River, AB), James Rajotte (Edmonton Southwest, AB), Scott Reid (Lanark-Carleton, ON), John Reynolds (West Vancouver-Sunshine Coast, BC), Gerry Ritz (Battlefords-Lloydminster, SK), Werner Schmidt (Kelowna, BC), Carol Skelton (Saskatoon-Rosetown-Biggar, SK), Monte Solberg (Medicine Hat, AB), Kevin Sorenson (Crowfoot, AB), Darrel Stinson (Okanagan-Shuswap, BC), Greg Thompson (New Brunswick Southwest, NB), Myron Thompson (Wild Rose, AB), Vic Toews (Provencher, MB), Maurice Vellacott (Saskatoon-Wanuskewin, SK), Randy White (Langley-Abbotsford, BC), John Williams (St. Albert, AB), Lynne Yelich (Blackstrap, SK)
Senators: (2) Gerry St. Germain (BC), David Tkachuk (SK)

Belinda Stronach
37, CEO of Magna International (2001–)

Caucus Endorsements
MPs: (7) Gary Schellenberger (Perth-Middlesex, ON), Bill Casey (Cumberland-Colchester, NS), John Cummins (Delta-South Richmond, BC), Val Meredith (South Surrey-White Rock-Langley, BC), Loyola Hearn (St. John's West, NL), Rex Barnes (Gander—Grand Falls, NL), Inky Mark (Dauphin-Swan River, MB)
Senators: (13) David Angus (QC), Ethel Cochrane (NF), Consiglio Di Nino (ON), John Trevor Eyton (ON), J. Michael Forrestall (NS), Noël Kinsella (NB), Pierre Claude Nolin (QC), John Buchanan (NS), Gerald Comeau (NS), Donald Oliver (NS), Marjory LeBreton (ON), Pat Carney (BC), Leonard Gustafson (SK)

Announced they would not run
Scott Brison - Progressive Conservative Member of Parliament (later defected to the Liberals)
Mike Harris - former Premier of Ontario
Ralph Klein - Premier of Alberta
Bernard Lord - Premier of New Brunswick
Peter MacKay - former Progressive Conservative Party Leader
Brian Pallister - Canadian Alliance Member of Parliament
Jim Prentice - Progressive Conservative 2003 leadership race runner up, later Premier of Alberta
Bob Runciman - former Ontario public security minister
Larry Smith - Publisher of the Montreal Gazette
Chuck Strahl - Canadian Alliance Member of Parliament

Results

Points needed to win: 15,401

Each of 308 ridings had 100 points which were distributed by proportional representation according to votes cast by party members in the riding.

The actual vote totals remained confidential when the leadership election results were announced; only the point totals were made public at the time, giving the impression of a race that was much closer than was actually the case. Three years later, Harper's former campaign manager, Tom Flanagan, published the actual vote totals, noting that, among other distortions caused by the equal-weighting system, "a vote cast in Quebec was worth 19.6 times as much as a vote cast in Alberta".

Total expenses
Belinda Stronach $2,496,482
Stephen Harper $2,073,084
Tony Clement $826,807

Timeline

December 2003
December 5 - The Canadian Alliance votes with a 96% majority in favour of merging with the Progressive Conservative Party of Canada.
December 6 - The Progressive Conservative Party votes, with 90% of delegates in favour of merging with the Canadian Alliance.
December 8 - The Conservative Party of Canada is officially registered with Elections Canada. The party's first interim leader is Senator John Lynch-Staunton, with a formal leadership race scheduled for March 2004.
December 10 - Scott Brison, Progressive Conservative MP, crosses the floor, and sits with the Liberal Party of Canada. Brison is the fourth PC MP, out of an original caucus of 15, to decide not to sit with the new Conservative Party of Canada.
December 30 - Bernard Lord, Premier of New Brunswick, reconfirms that he will not seek the leadership of the Conservative Party. He had been considered a potential frontrunner.

January 2004
January 12 - Stephen Harper announces his entry into the race to lead the new Conservative Party of Canada. Earlier that day, Jim Prentice drops out of the leadership contest, citing a lack of funds.
January 13 - Peter MacKay declares he will not enter the race to lead the new Conservative Party of Canada.
January 15 - Auto parts magnate Belinda Stronach and former Ontario Health Minister Tony Clement both announce their intention to run for leadership of the Conservative Party.
January 16 - Fraser Valley MP Chuck Strahl announces he will not seek the Conservative leadership, citing financial barriers.
January 20 - Belinda Stronach formally announces the launch of her campaign to seek the Conservative leadership. She rounds out the field at three; no other serious contenders are now seen as planning an entry.

March 2004
March 19 - The leadership convention opens in Toronto; the candidates give opening speeches.
March 20 - Stephen Harper wins on the first ballot with 56% of points, under the party's weighted voting system.
March 22 - Harper names former PC leader Peter MacKay the deputy leader of the Conservative party.

Breakdown by province

Breakdown by riding

Newfoundland and Labrador

Prince Edward Island

Nova Scotia

New Brunswick

Quebec

Ontario

Manitoba

Saskatchewan

Alberta

British Columbia

Yukon

Northwest Territories

Nunavut

See also

Canadian Alliance leadership elections
Progressive Conservative leadership conventions

References

2004 elections in Canada
2004
Conservative Party of Canada leadership election